2MASS J04070752+1546457 (abbreviated to 2MASS J0407+1546) is a rapidly-rotating brown dwarf of spectral class L3.5, located in the constellation Taurus about 119 light-years from Earth. With a photometrically measured rotation period of 1.23 hours, it is one of the fastest-rotating known brown dwarfs announced by a team of astronomers led by Megan E. Tannock in March 2021. As a consequence of its rapid rotation, the brown dwarf is slightly flattened at its poles to a similar degree as Saturn, the most oblate planet in the Solar System. Its rapid rotation may enable strong auroral radio emissions via particle interactions in its magnetic field, as observed in other known rapidly-rotating brown dwarfs.

Discovery 
2MASS J0407+1546 was first catalogued as a point source in June 2003 by the Two Micron All-Sky Survey (2MASS) organized by the University of Massachusetts Amherst
and the Infrared Processing and Analysis Center under the California Institute of Technology. It was discovered to be a brown dwarf of the spectral class L3.5 by I. Neill Reid and collaborators, based on near-infrared spectra obtained in October 2005 with the Gemini North at the Mauna Kea Observatory, Hawaii. Their discovery and spectroscopic characterization of 430 ultracool dwarfs including 2MASS J0407+1546 was published in The Astronomical Journal in September 2008.

Distance 

Proper motion 
From Gaia DR2, 2MASS J0407+1546 has a measured net proper motion of 81.0 mas/yr with position angle 139.06 degrees, indicating motion in south-east direction on the sky.

See also 
 2MASS J12195156+3128497 – L8 spectral class brown dwarf with a period of 
 2MASS J03480772−6022270 – T7 spectral class brown dwarf with a period of

Notes

References

External links 
 Trio of Fast-Spinning Brown Dwarfs May Reveal a Rotational Speed Limit, Calla Cofield, Jet Propulsion Laboratory, 7 April 2021
 Western space scientists identify fastest-spinning "failed stars" ever found, Jeff Renaud, University of Western Ontario, 7 April 2021
 Caught Speeding: Clocking the Fastest-Spinning Brown Dwarfs, NOIRLab, 7 April 2021

Taurus (constellation)
Brown dwarfs
L-type stars
J04070752+1546457
Astronomical objects discovered in 2008